Cetate Devatrans Deva is a women's handball club from Deva, Romania.

Honours

EHF Challenge Cup:                           
Winners (1): 2001-02

Notable players
 Paula Ungureanu
 Valentina Ardean-Elisei
 Carmen Cartaș
 Melinda Tóth
 Verica Nikolić

External links
 

Romanian handball clubs
Deva, Romania
Handball clubs established in 2002
2002 establishments in Romania